Francis Lister (2 April 1899 – 28 October 1951) was a British actor. He was married to the actresses Nora Swinburne (1924–32) and Margot Grahame (1934-36).

Filmography

References

External links

The Francis Lister Collection is held by the Victoria and Albert Museum Theatre and Performance Department.

1899 births
1951 deaths
English male stage actors
English male film actors
English male silent film actors
Male actors from London
20th-century English male actors